Bengkulu or Bengkulu Malay is a Malayic language spoken on the Indonesian island of Sumatra, around the city of Bengkulu, in the rest of the Indonesian province of Bengkulu and in the Pesisir Barat Regency ("west coast") of Lampung Province. It is more closely related to other Malay variants in Sumatra such as Col, Jambi Malay and Palembang Malay as well Minangkabau spoken in neighbouring West Sumatra than to the Rejang language, which is also spoken in the province.

Phonology
Bengkulu is written in the Latin alphabet and sometimes in Rejang script.

Consonants 

Vowels

Bengkulu diphthongs are ai, au, ia and ua (where "ia" and "ua" are used in loanwords).

References

Languages of Indonesia
Malay language
Malay dialects

Malayic languages